Pierre Bruno Bourla (19 December 1783 – 31 December 1866) was a Paris-born Belgian architect. He was the city architect in Antwerp from 1819 to 1861, and a professor of architecture at the Royal Academy of Fine Arts Antwerp. His most famous work is the Royal Theatre built between 1827 and 1834, known popularly after him as the Bourla theatre. He also designed new buildings for the Antwerp Academy, built the entrance gate to the city's botanical gardens, expanded the St. Elizabeth's hospital, restored the cathedral, and renovated the town hall.

He died in Antwerp in 1866, and was buried at St. Lawrence's. His body was transferred to the Schoonselhof cemetery in 1930.

Honours 
 1846: Member of the Royal Academy of Science, Letters and Fine Arts of Belgium
 1840: Knight of the Order of Leopold.

Gallery

References

 Alfred Willis, "Bourla, Pierre (Bruno)," Grove Art Online, Oxford University Press [accessed 11 April 2008]
 "Bourla Theater" at A View on Cities
 Schoonselhof cemetery

1783 births
1866 deaths
Architects from Antwerp
Belgian neoclassical architects
Academic staff of the Royal Academy of Fine Arts (Antwerp)
Members of the Royal Academy of Belgium